The Lion's Share may refer to:

 Lion's share, an idiomatic expression derived from a fable by Aesop
 The Lion's Share (1971 film), a 1971 French-Italian crime thriller
 The Lion's Share (1978 film), a 1978 Argentinean film
 Lion's Share (band), a Swedish heavy metal band